Adilson dos Santos, shortly Adi or Adilson (born 12 May 1976), is a former Brazilian footballer, who last played as a left-back for South Korean K League Classic side FC Seoul. His good impression in Seoul was such that after retiring, he stayed as assistant manager at the club.

Club career
Adilson started his senior career playing with Apucarana Atlético Clube, and by 1998 he was estimated the best defender in Paraná State championship.

Next year, he moved to Serbian Red Star Belgrade where he played 11 matches in the First League of FR Yugoslavia during the 1998–99 season.

In 1999, he moved to Real Betis. but he did not make debut and moved to Sevilla FC. However, Sevilla did not have enough money to pay the transfer fee, so Real Betis lodged a complaint against Sevilla FC and he was not allowed to play for Sevilla FC. After the issue of the fee was resolved, he still did not play because he was deemed too young a player and the club was in the danger of regulation. He ended up playing on their B team.

In 2001, he moved to the giant club of China, Dalian Shide. He had succeeded in this club. He became the champion of Asia once and China 4 times also twice of Chinese FA Cup.

In March 2006, he moved to FC Seoul of K League Classic of South Korea 

He was winner of K-League Best XI  in 2007, 2008 and 2010. He is now considered the best defender of the K-League after a collection of outstanding performances.

On 29 January 2014, he retired at FC Seoul and appointed as coach.

Career statistics

Club 
Statistics accurate as of 3 December 2013

Honours

Player
Paraná Clube
 Campeonato Paranaense Winners : 1997

Red Star Belgrade
 FR Yugoslav Cup Winners : 1998–99

Dalian Shide
 Chinese Jia-A League Winners (3) : 2000, 2001, 2002
 Chinese Super League Winners (1) : 2005
 Chinese FA Cup Winners (2) : 2001, 2005
 Chinese Football Super Cup Winners (2) : 2000, 2002
 Asian Cup Winners' Cup Runners-up: 2000–01

FC Seoul
 K League Winners (2) : 2010, 2012
 K League Runners-up (1) : 2008
 League Cup Winners (2) : 2006, 2010
 League Cup Runners-up (1) : 2007
 AFC Champions League Runners-up (1) : 2013

Individual
 K League Best XI (5) : 2007, 2008, 2010, 2012, 2013

References

External links

 
 Adilson at playmakerstats.com (English version of ogol.com.br)

1976 births
Living people
Association football defenders
Association football midfielders
Brazilian footballers
Brazilian expatriate footballers
Paraná Clube players
Red Star Belgrade footballers
Real Betis players
Sevilla FC players
Dalian Shide F.C. players
FC Seoul players
Chinese Super League players
K League 1 players
FC Seoul non-playing staff
Expatriate footballers in Serbia and Montenegro
Expatriate footballers in Spain
Expatriate footballers in China
Expatriate footballers in South Korea
People from Aracaju
Brazilian expatriate sportspeople in Spain
Brazilian expatriate sportspeople in China
Brazilian expatriate sportspeople in South Korea
Brazilian expatriate sportspeople in Serbia and Montenegro
Sportspeople from Sergipe